This article is a list of diseases of azalea (Rhododendron spp.).

Fungal diseases

Nematodes, parasitic

References
Common Names of Diseases, The American Phytopathological Society

Azalea
Rhododendron